Haldia Institute of Technology, better known as HIT Haldia  is an autonomous self-financed private engineering institute in West Bengal, India, approved by All India Council for Technical Education (AICTE), New Delhi, and affiliated to Maulana Abul Kalam Azad University of Technology (MAKAUT). It is an institution maintained and financed by ICARE (Indian Center for Advancement of Research and Education, Haldia ICARE, Haldia), a non-profit making voluntary organization. It is one of the oldest technological institutes in West Bengal.HIT  has an enclave campus of 37 acres of land having an administrative block of 153780.5 square meters with nine academic blocks having an area of around 24980 square meters and a hostel area of 24315 square meters. The hostel facility is available for both boys and girls to accommodate almost all the students  

. The college offers 13 B.Tech courses, and 5 M.Tech and MCA, MBA courses.

Campus 
The campus comprises

 an administrative block
 academic block
 Student Housing
 Library
 Departmental store
 Post Office
 Laundry
 Medical Store
 Bank 
 ATM(24x7)
 Restaurant
 Open air cafetaria
 Recreational building
 Football ground
 Basketball court
 Cricket ground

Student Housing 
The college campus provides us with separate housing facility or dormitory (hostels) for boys and girls :

 Boys Hostels
 Newton Hall of Residence  aka 
 Newton Hall of Residence  aka
 Newton Hall of Residence  aka
 Newton Hall of Residence  aka 
 Newton Hall of Residence  aka
 Ranichak Boys Hostel
 Balaji Boys Hostel

 Girls Hostels
 Tamalika Ponda Seth Hall of Residence
 Matangini Hall of Residence
 Foreign Hostel

Schools and Departments

Undergraduate 
Haldia Institute of Technology has the following schools and departments:
School of Engineering
Department of Mechanical engineering
Department of Electrical engineering
Department of Applied Electronics and Instrumentation Engineering
Department of Civil engineering
School of Applied Sciences & Humanities
Department of Applied Sciences

 School of Chemical, Food & BioTechnology
Department of Chemical engineering
Department of Biotechnology
Department of Food technology
School of Electronics, Computer & Informatics
Department of Computer science and engineering
Department of Computer science and engineering  (Data science)
Department of Computer science and engineering  (Cyber Security)
Department of Computer science and engineering  (Artificial intelligence and Machine learning) 
Department of Information technology 
Department of Electronic and Communications Engineering

Postgraduate 

 School of Management & Social Sciences
Department of MBA

Student life

Cultural and Non-academic Activities 
The annual Science & Technology festival of  HIT is PRAYUKTI. 

The annual cultural festival Rivera, usually held in the month of May-June is an event hosted by the student body.

Accreditation 
Haldia Institute of Technology is accredited by the National Assessment and Accreditation Council (NAAC) with an "A" grade in 2018, with CGPA of 3.31 on 4 point scale. Most of the courses are provisionally accredited by the National Board of Accreditation (NBA).

Ranking 

Haldia Institute of Technology ranked in the 251–300 band among engineering colleges in India by the National Institutional Ranking Framework (NIRF).

Admission 
For B.Tech course, one has to clear State level entrance exam WBJEE & Jee(main). JELET is exam for 2nd year lateral entry B.Tech course.

See also 
 List of institutions of higher education in West Bengal

References

External links 

Haldia Institute of Technology Official website

Engineering colleges in West Bengal
Universities and colleges in Purba Medinipur district
Colleges affiliated to West Bengal University of Technology
Academic institutions formerly affiliated with Vidyasagar University
Haldia
Educational institutions established in 1996
1996 establishments in West Bengal